"Mine" is a song by American singer-songwriter Bazzi. The song was self-released digitally on October 12, 2017. The song made its chart debut on February 3, 2018, after becoming an internet meme. The song charted in various countries including the United States, where it peaked at number 11 on the Billboard Hot 100. The single was certified platinum in the United States, Australia, Canada, Sweden and New Zealand. The song was later featured as the 14th track on his debut album Cosmic, which was released on April 12, 2018.

Background and release
Bazzi recorded the initial ideas for the song in a few voice memos that were dated July 5, 2017. One contained him whistling the opening notes of the song, another contained him beatboxing, and another contained him singing the lyrics “I’m so fucking happy you’re alive” which ended up being used in the final song.

The song became an internet meme after gaining popularity in late January 2018. The videos featured a slideshow of different pictures of the subject of the video with the Snapchat "hearts" filter and overlaying lyrics. The last word of each song line was surrounded by different "heart" and "kiss" emojis.

Charts

Weekly charts

Year-end charts

Certifications

References

Bazzi (singer) songs
Internet memes introduced in 2018
2017 songs
Songs written by Bazzi (singer)